The 2003–04 season is Stockport County's 122nd season in football. Stockport finished the league season in 19th, two places off the relegation zone. This season ran from 9 August 2003 to 8 May 2004.

Background

Following a poor start to the 2003–2004 season player-manager Carlton Palmer was sacked by the club in September.

Upon completion of the Euro 2004 qualifying matches with Northern Ireland, Sammy McIlroy re-entered club management signing a three-year deal in October 2003.

Summary

Results summary

Second Division table

Statistics

Goalscorers

Results

Legend

Second Division

FA Cup
First Round

League Cup
First Round

Football League Trophy
First Round

Team

Squad

Left during the season

References

External links
 Official Site

Stockport County
Stockport County F.C. seasons